Events in the year 1995 in Bulgaria.

Incumbents 

 President: Zhelyu Zhelev
 Prime Minister: Reneta Indzhova (from 1994 until January 25) Zhan Videnov (from January 25 until 1997)

Events 

1 April – The first episode of the Bulgarian television comedy Kanaleto is broadcast on Bulgarian National Television.

References 

 
1990s in Bulgaria
Years of the 20th century in Bulgaria
Bulgaria
Bulgaria